is a local delicacy from Hokkaidō, Japan. It consists of the kidney of chum salmon pickled in a salt solution until a dark brownish black. It is often served with alcohol or as a side dish.

References

Japanese seafood
Hokkaido